Burgbernheim station is a railway station in the municipality of Burgbernheim, located in the district of Neustadt (Aisch)-Bad Windsheim in Middle Franconia, Germany.

References

Railway stations in Bavaria
Buildings and structures in Neustadt (Aisch)-Bad Windsheim